Sir William Bartlett Dalby (1840 - 1918) was a British aural surgeon and otologist, who was knighted in 1886.

Dalby was consulting ear surgeon to St George's Hospital. In 1894–1895 he was president of the Medical Society. He was in 1899–1901 the first president of the Otological Society of the United Kingdom, which in 1907 amalgamated with the Royal Society of Medicine to became the Section of Otology.

References

External links
 

Lectures on diseases and injuries of the ear by W. B. Dalby, hathitrust.org

1840 births
1918 deaths
Alumni of Sidney Sussex College, Cambridge
British otolaryngologists
Fellows of the Royal College of Surgeons